Pennsylvania Route 554 (PA 554) is a highway which runs for 8 miles (14 km) generally north–south in Lycoming County in north central Pennsylvania in the United States. Its southern terminus is at PA 44 just north of the unincorporated village of Elimsport in Washington Township and its northern terminus is at U.S. Route 15 (US 15) in South Williamsport.

Route description

Starting at its southern end in Washington Township, PA 554 runs generally north to North White Deer Ridge, which it climbs in a series of curves and two hairpin turns. It crosses into Armstrong Township at the summit and into the valley between North White Deer Ridge and  Bald Eagle Mountain, where it passes the Hagermans Run Reservoir. It then follows Hagermans Run down the north side of Bald Eagle Mountain into the borough of South Williamsport, where it ends at US 15. It does not intersect any other highways.

The route is through farmland north to the mountain, and then is through forests, with much of the land on the mountain in the Tiadaghton State Forest. The Hagermans Run Reservoir is part of the Williamsport Water Authority and much of the route along Hagermans Run is also protected watershed land. There is one limestone quarry in operation in Armstrong Township along the highway.

History
PA 554 was commissioned in 1928. By 1941, the northern endpoint was redesignated from US 15 and US 220 in Williamsport to its current alignment.

Major intersections

See also

References

External links

Pennsylvania Highways: PA 554

554
Transportation in Lycoming County, Pennsylvania